The 2018 Milton Keynes Council election took place on 3 May 2018 to elect members of Milton Keynes Council in England. This election was held on the same day as other local elections.

After the election, the composition of the council was:

Election results

Overall election result

Overall result compared with 2016.

Ward Results

Notes

References

Milton Keynes
Milton Keynes Council elections
2010s in Buckinghamshire